Into Violet is the debut EP by South Korean girl group Purple Kiss. It was released on 15 March 2021 by RBW and Kakao Entertainment. The EP consists of 7 tracks with "Ponzona" serving as the lead single. It also contains their 2 previously released tracks, "My Heart Skip A Beat" and "Can We Talk Again".

Background 
The ensemble was first introduced to the public by the entertainment company RBW under the tentative name "365 Practice".  And it was announced that Purple Kiss is set to make their debut in early March 2021. After formally introducing the group one by one, On November 26, 2020, the group released their first pre-debut digital single, "My Heart Skip a Beat."Due to a temporary health issue, Swan was unable to participate in the single or its music video. The song was well-received by the Korean press, and it contained choreography designed by the members. Yuki also wrote an original rap portion for the song. "Can We Talk Again," the group's second pre-debut song, was released on February 3, 2021, and included all seven members. The single, a somber R&B number, was in stark contrast to the Rock-inspired "My Heart Skip a Beat," which was intended to demonstrate the group's stylistic diversity.

Composition 
The album consist of 7 tracks. The title song "Ponzona" is a song that means 'poison' in Spanish language, and it expresses the aspiration of the Purple Kiss to color the world with their charms. Other six songs include a 39-second intro titled "Intro:Crown", "Skip Skip", which rejects judging oneself prematurely with witty lyrics, "Hello", a melody to say goodbye to someone far away, "Period", a self-produced track of Purple Kiss, and the previously released singles "My Heart Skip a Beat" and "Can We Talk Again".

Promotions 
The group had a showcase at Yes24 Live Hall in Gwanjang-dong, Gwangjin-gu, Seoul on the afternoon of the 15th to communicate with fans and introduce the extended play, where they performed both "Ponzona" and "Skip Skip", a b side track.

Commercial performance 
"Ponzona" did not enter the Gaon Digital Chart but debuted and peaked at number 99 on the Gaon Download Chart. The album recorded 29,985 sales on the month of April, and peaked at number 11 on the 12th week of 2021.

Track-listing

Charts

Release history

References 

2021 debut EPs
Korean-language EPs